Ante Čačić (born 29 September 1953) is a Croatian professional football manager who is the current head coach of Croatian Football League club Dinamo Zagreb.

Čačić graduated from the Faculty of Physical Education at the University of Zagreb. He was one of the first ten football coaches in Croatia to get the UEFA Pro Licence.

Coaching career
During his career, he successfully achieved promotion to the top division with Inter Zaprešić and Dubrava. He also coached Zadar, Osijek, Slaven Belupo, Kamen Ingrad, Croatia Sesvete and Lokomotiva.

Inter Zaprešić
In the 2002–03 season, Čačić was at the helm of Inter Zaprešić in the south division in Druga HNL. In March 2003, he resigned after losing to the first-placed team Uljanik, leaving Inter at the second place in the table and five points behind the leaders. He was replaced with Ilija Lončarević, who achieved promotion to Prva HNL.

Libya
When Lončarević was appointed manager of the Libya national football team, he named Čačić as his assistant. During his time at Libya, he was chosen to lead their under-20 squad at the 2005 Mediterranean Games held in Spain. After losing to the hosts in the semi-finals, they won the bronze medal after defeating Morocco in the penalty shoot-out.

Kamen Ingrad
In June 2006, Čačić returned to Croatia and was appointed manager of Kamen Ingrad, but after only three months he terminated his contract.

Return to Inter Zaprešić
In October 2006, he again took over the helm of Inter Zaprešić after they sacked Srećko Bogdan. Čačić led Inter to the first place in the 2006–07 Druga HNL and the team was promoted to Prva HNL. After a disappointing start in the following season, he was sacked in August 2007.

Lokomotiva
In October 2011, Čačić was appointed manager of Lokomotiva. They finished in the sixth place at the winter break, undefeated in four games led by Čačić.

Dinamo Zagreb
On 23 December 2011, it was announced that Čačić had signed a one-and-a-half-year contract with Dinamo Zagreb. He was sacked from Dinamo in November 2012.

Radnik Sesvete
Čačić was without assignment until April 2013 when he took over as manager of Radnik Sesvete.

Maribor
Čačić left Radnik Sesvete in early June 2013, when he accepted an offer from Slovenian champions Maribor.

Slaven Belupo
Čačić became manager of Slaven Belupo on 4 November 2014 and the club finished sixth in his only season at the helm of the club.

Return to Lokomotiva
Čačić again became manager of Lokomotiva on 3 June 2015 and was with the club for only three months before being selected as head coach of the Croatia national football team.

Croatia

Euro 2016: Qualifying and finals
Following the sacking of Niko Kovač, which was caused due to a poor run in the Euro 2016 qualifying, Ante Čačić was appointed as head coach of the Croatia national team. His appointment was very controversial and left fans of the national team in shock. Croatia finished second in their qualifying group, securing a place in the group stages of Euro 2016 in France. Croatia enjoyed a memorable group stage run, topping their group after beating European champions Spain by a scoreline of 2–1 on 21 June, despite key-player Luka Modrić not playing due to injury problems. However, Croatian fans had earlier sparked controversy during a match against the Czech Republic, which finished 2–2, when flares were lit at the near end of the match. After beating Spain, Croatia were tipped as one of the favorites to win the tournament, but they were knocked out by future winners Portugal in the round of sixteen.

Čačić was voted as the 7th Best National Team Coach by the International Federation of Football History & Statistics.

FIFA World Cup 2018: Qualifying and sacking
Čačić took Croatia to a strong start in their qualifying campaign, with Croatia leading their group and remaining undefeated. However, defeats to Iceland and Turkey, as well as a draw to Finland threatened their progression and caused a public outcry against Čačić, who was criticized for his poor team selection, decreasing player morale and losing support from players and fans. Čačić was also criticized by former Croatia head coach Miroslav Blažević.

He was sacked on 7 October 2017, with Zlatko Dalić being named as his successor.

Pyramids
On 27 December 2019, he was appointed manager of Egyptian club Pyramids FC. He led his team to reach the 2020 CAF Confederation Cup Final, which they lost 0–1 against RS Berkane. Later on, Pyramids decided to find a new coach, after they finished third in the 2019–20 Egyptian Premier League.

Return to Dinamo Zagreb
On 21 April 2022, he became the manager of Dinamo Zagreb by the end of the 2021–22 season, in which he eventually led them to win their 23rd league title.

Čačić successfully guided Dinamo back into the Champions League group stages the following season, beating Shkupi, Ludogorets and Bodø/Glimt in the qualification rounds. Dinamo won their opening match in the group stage against Chelsea at the Maksimir, thanks to a goal from Mislav Oršić. Chelsea boss Thomas Tuchel was subsequently sacked the following day.

Managerial statistics

Honours

Manager

Club  
Dinamo Zagreb
Croatian Football League: 2011–12, 2021–22
Croatian Cup: 2011–12
Croatian Supercup: 2022

Maribor
Slovenian Supercup: 2013

Pyramids
CAF Confederation Cup runners-up : 2019–20

International 
Libya U20
Mediterranean Games third place: 2005

Individual 
2016: 7th Best National Team Coach, voted by IFFHS

References

External links
Ante Čačić on British Eurosport

1953 births
Living people
Sportspeople from Zagreb
Croatian football managers
NK Zadar managers
NK Inter Zaprešić managers
NK Osijek managers
NK Slaven Belupo managers
NK Croatia Sesvete managers
NK Kamen Ingrad managers
NK Lokomotiva Zagreb managers
GNK Dinamo Zagreb managers
NK Maribor managers
Croatia national football team managers
Pyramids FC managers
UEFA Euro 2016 managers
Croatian Football League managers
Croatian expatriate football managers
Expatriate football managers in Libya
Croatian expatriate sportspeople in Libya
Expatriate football managers in Slovenia
Croatian expatriate sportspeople in Slovenia
Expatriate football managers in Egypt
Croatian expatriate sportspeople in Egypt